This is a progressive list of men's association footballers who have held or co-held the Oceania record for international goals since 1922.

Criteria
The criteria used by national FAs in considering a match as a full international were not historically fixed. Particularly for the early decades, and until more recently for FAs outside UEFA and CONMEBOL, counts of goals were often considered unreliable. IFFHS and RSSSF have spent much effort trying to produce definitive lists of full international matches, and corresponding data on players' international caps and goals. Australia and New Zealand's FAs have their own official caps and goals database, however other OFC members' FA's do not have their own caps and goals database. Using the data by the FA, NZF RSSSF and NFT, the following records can be retrospectively produced. Note that, at the time, these records may not have been recognised.

Although Australia played in the OFC, they were moved to the AFC confederation in 2006. This affects Tim Cahill, who scored 8 Oceania goals and 42 Asian goals. Australia's player goals in the AFC have been removed for consistency and only count their players' goals from 1922 to 2005.

Oceania record

See also
 Progression of association football goalscoring record
 Progression of association football caps Oceania record
 List of men's footballers with 50 or more international goals

References
 Players with 100+ Caps and 30+ International Goals RSSSF
 IFFHS ALL TIME RECORD GOAL SCORERS IN NATIONAL TEAM - OCEANIA IFFHS

O